Charlton railway station is a railway station in south east London.

Charlton railway station may also refer to:

Charlton railway station, Victoria, Australia 
Charlton (Northumberland) railway station, England
Charlton Halt railway station (Bristol), England
Charlton Halt railway station (Oxfordshire), England